Conference of Catholic Bishops of Belarus is the collective body of the national church and the administration of the Catholic Church in Belarus. It was established and approved on February 11, 1999. The first chairman was Cardinal Kazimierz Świątek.

Chairmen of the Conference

 Cardinal Kazimierz Świątek (1999 to 2006)
 Bishop Aleksander Kaszkiewicz from 2006 to 2015
 Archbishop Tadeusz Kondrusiewicz from 2015 to present

Composition

As of 2015, the conference consisted of:

 Archbishop of Minsk-Mohilev Tadeusz Kondrusiewicz, Chairman
 Bishop of Vitebsk Aleh Butkewitsch, deputy chairman
 Assistant Bishop of Grodno Josif Staneuski, Secretary-General
 Bishop of Grodno Aleksander Kaszkiewicz
 Bishop of Pinsk Anthony Demyanko
 Assistant Bishop of Pinsk, Kazimierz Wielikosielec
 Assistant Bishop of Minsk-Mohilev, Juri Kasabutski
 Assistant Bishop of Minsk-Mohilev, Aleksandr Jaschewski

Structure

There are committees, councils and sections on various subjects and responsibilities including:
 Pastoral center
 Ecclesiastical court
 Construction Bureau 
 Commission for the Family
 Catechetical section
 Translation of liturgical texts and official documents of the Commission of the Catholic Church of God Worship and Discipline of the Sacraments 
 Church music and worship God the Commission Discipline of the Sacraments 
 Media
 Catholic Association for Communication SIGNIS-BELARUS.

See also
 Episcopal Conference
 Catholic Church in Belarus

Notes

Further reading
 gcatholic.org

External links
 

Belarus
Catholic Church in Belarus
Christian organizations established in 1999
1999 establishments in Belarus